The 1993 Florida Citrus Bowl was a college football bowl game played between the Big Ten Conference's Ohio State Buckeyes and the Southeastern Conference's Georgia Bulldogs.  The game was dominated by the running back.  Georgia's Garrison Hearst had two touchdowns and was named the game's MVP. Ohio State's Robert Smith had a touchdown and ran for over 100 yards. Georgia won 21–14.

References

Florida Citrus Bow
Citrus Bowl (game)
Georgia Bulldogs football bowl games
Ohio State Buckeyes football bowl games
Florida Citrus Bowl
Florida Citrus Bowl